Amauri Sanit Sabouren (born July 4, 1979) is a Cuban former professional baseball pitcher. Sanit played for the Industriales of the Cuban National Series before defecting from Cuba in 2006. He pitched in Major League Baseball for the New York Yankees in 2011, before joining the Tigres in 2012.

Playing career
Sanit grew up boxing, but switched to baseball at age 16. He became a closer in the Cuban National Series for the Industriales. When Cuban officials became aware of Sanit's desire to play in the United States, they began to hold back his career to prevent him from being showcased, not allowing him to play on the Cuban national baseball team. As a result, Sanit defected in 2006.

Sanit arrived in Mexico, then he went to Costa Rica. Later he went to Guatemala where he had a record of 4–0 and 0.00 of ERA. Then he went to Panama before going to the Dominican Republic.

In the Dominican Republic in 2008, the New York Yankees of Major League Baseball discovered Sanit and signed him to a minor league contract. Sanit was invited to the Yankees' spring training camp in 2010, but failed to make the final roster. While a member of the Scranton/Wilkes-Barre Yankees of the Class AAA International League in 2010, he was suspended for 50 games for the use of performance-enhancing drugs.

Sanit made his major league debut on May 12, 2011, after the Yankees purchased his contract earlier in the day. As of 2016 he was one of 12 Yankees pitchers since 1919 to make his debut after turning 29 years old, with the most recent being Richard Bleier in 2016.

On June 16, the Yankees released Sanit to clear a 40-man roster spot for Brian Gordon.

In 2012, Sanit signed with the Tigres de Quintana Roo of the Mexican League. He pitched against the Texas Rangers of MLB in an exhibition in 2014.

See also

List of baseball players who defected from Cuba

References

External links
, or Baseball  Reference (Cuban, Minor, Mexican and Winter Leagues), or Retrosheet, or Pelota Binaria (Venezuelan Winter League)

1979 births
Living people
Águilas del Zulia players
Defecting Cuban baseball players
Dominican Summer League Yankees players
Gulf Coast Yankees players
Indios de Mayagüez players
Cuban expatriate baseball players in Puerto Rico
Industriales de La Habana players
Major League Baseball pitchers
Major League Baseball players from Cuba
Cuban expatriate baseball players in the United States
Metropolitanos de La Habana players
Navegantes del Magallanes players
Cuban expatriate baseball players in Venezuela
New York Yankees players
Scranton/Wilkes-Barre Yankees players
Baseball players from Havana
Tampa Yankees players
Tigres de Quintana Roo players
Tigres del Licey players
Cuban expatriate baseball players in the Dominican Republic
Tomateros de Culiacán players
Cuban expatriate baseball players in Mexico
Trenton Thunder players